Yasir bin Othman Al-Rumayyan is a Saudi businessman who is governor of the Public Investment Fund (PIF), the sovereign wealth fund of the Kingdom of Saudi Arabia. He also serves as the chairman of English football club Newcastle United and the chairman of state-owned petroleum company Saudi Aramco.

Early life and education 

Yasir Al-Rumayyan was born in Buraidah, Al-Qassim Province, in 1970 and graduated from King Faisal University in Alahsa in 1993.

Career 
He began his career at Saudi Hollandi Bank, becoming head of international brokerage before joining the Capital Markets Authority (CMA), where he was head of securities listings. Between 2011 and 2015, Al-Rumayyan was CEO of Saudi Fransi Capital (SFC), the investment banking arm of Banque Saudi Fransi. From 2014 to 2015 he was on the board of directors of the Saudi Stock Exchange.

Al-Rumayyan sits on the boards of SoftBank Group and Reliance Industries Ltd.

Public Investment Fund 
In September 2015, Al-Rumayyan was appointed managing director of the Public Investment Fund of Saudi Arabia (PIF).

In 2016, PIF invested $3.5 billion in the US-based Uber He joined Uber's board of directors as part of the agreement.

In August 2016, Al-Rumayyan joined the board of the state oil company Saudi Aramco as part of a move toward closer cooperation between Aramco and PIF in restructuring the Saudi economy. In October that year, PIF invested $45 billion in the newly established SoftBank Vision Fund. In May 2017, PIF invested $20 billion to a joint US infrastructure fund with Blackstone.

Al-Rumayyan was involved in the transfer of assets to PIF in the wake of the Saudi Arabian government's 2017 purge. Al-Rumayyan transferred 20 companies that had been seized by the government into the PIF, including one later alleged to be used by Saudi operatives in the murder of journalist Jamal Khashoggi.

In October 2021, PIF announced that the acquisition of Newcastle United by the consortium consisting of the Public Investment Fund and that Al-Rumayyan would be elected as chairman of the club after PIF acquired it.

References 

1970 births
Living people
King Faisal University alumni
Newcastle United F.C. directors and chairmen
Saudi Arabian businesspeople
Saudi Arabian investment bankers
Saudi Arabian government officials
SoftBank people
Uber people